Kraken is a United States–based cryptocurrency exchange, founded in 2011. It was one of the first bitcoin exchanges to be listed on Bloomberg Terminal and is reportedly valued at US$10.8 billion, as of mid-summer 2022. The company has been the subject of several regulatory investigations since 2018, and has agreed to cumulative fines of over $30 million to resolve the disputes.

History
Kraken was co-founded in 2011 by Jesse Powell, an alumnus of California State University, Sacramento with Thanh Luu. Powell was a consultant for Mt. Gox in resolving a security issue, and began working on Kraken as a replacement anticipating its death; Gox would indeed collapse in 2014, failing security audits. In September 2013, Kraken was launched, offering Bitcoin, Litecoin, and euro trades initially before going on to add additional currencies and margin trading.

In March 2014, Kraken received a $5 million Series A investment from Hummingbird Ventures and Bitcoin Opportunity Fund. A month later, Kraken became one of the first bitcoin exchanges to be listed on Bloomberg Terminal. The same year, Kraken was chosen to assist with the investigation of lost bitcoins of Mt. Gox; the bankruptcy trustees relied upon Kraken due to its proven operating history without being breached by hackers. In June 2015, Kraken opened the first dark pool for bitcoins.

In January 2016, Kraken purchased Coinsetter (and by extension, Cavirtex), an exchange based out of New York City. A month later, Kraken announced the completion of its Series B round of investment led by the SBI Group and acquired Dutch exchange CleverCoin, and Glidera, a cryptocurrency wallet service. In March 2017, Kraken acquired Cryptowatch, a charting and trading platform. By December 2017, Kraken claimed to be registering up to 50,000 new users a day.

In April 2018, Kraken announced closure of its services in Japan due to the rising costs of doing business. In February 2019, Kraken acquired Crypto Facilities, a British derivatives trading firm. In June 2019, Kraken received $13.5 million from 2,263 individual investors via a special-purpose vehicle. 

In September 2020, Kraken was granted a special purpose depository institution (SPDI) charter in Wyoming, becoming the first cryptocurrency exchange to hold such a charter in the United States. In early 2021, Kraken sought additional funding from investors at a valuation of over $20 billion, with Tribe Capital becoming the company's second largest institutional investor behind Hummingbird Ventures and Arjun Sethi being appointed to the board of directors.

In January 2021, Kraken released a mobile app for international users, which became available in the US in June 2021. In September, 2022, Dave Ripley — then, chief operating officer — replaced Powell who was inducted as the chairman of Kraken’s board of directors. In November 2022, the company launched a beta version of its non-fungible token (NFT) marketplace.  

In February 2023, Kraken shut down its operations in Japan and United Arab Emirates.

Controversies

Government regulator investigations 
In April 2018, Kraken refused compliance with an investigation by the New York Attorney General's Office regarding the measures taken by cryptocurrency exchanges to protect their customers from market manipulation and money laundering, finding the associated expenditure to be bad for business. The report went on to warn that the Kraken might be breaking the law, suggested that customers stay away from it, and referred the platform to New York State Department of Financial Services for potential violation of local virtual currency regulations.

In March 2019, the exchange came to be investigated by the Office of Foreign Assets Control for potential violation of sanction-regimes by allowing trade with customers based in Iran; a settlement was reached  in November 2022 with Kraken paying a fine of $362,000 in addition to agreeing to "invest an additional $100,000 in certain sanctions compliance controls." In late September 2021, Kraken was ordered to pay a fine of $1.25 million to the Commodity Futures Trading Commission for offering unregistered margin trading. 

In February 2023, the Securities and Exchange Commission (SEC) categorized Kraken's staking service as an illegal sale of securities. The company agreed to a $30 million settlement with the SEC in response to allegations that its crypto-asset staking products broke the regulator’s rules; Kraken also agreed to cease selling its staking service in the U.S.

Identifying Glassdoor reviewers 
In May 2019, Kraken filed a motion in California's Marin County Superior Court to identify ten anonymous reviewers on Glassdoor. Kraken is suing them, for allegedly breaching their severance contract. The Electronic Frontier Foundation, which represents the anonymous reviewers, claims that identifying the reviewers would harm their First Amendment free-speech rights and chill the expression of others. The court has since ordered Glassdoor to disclose the real identity of some reviewers.

Work culture & layoffs 
In 2019, Powell suggested that parenting was a distraction to being productive and critiqued the economic viability of parental leaves; he went on to question whether choosing to not abide by relevant governmental regulations was a risk worth taking. In June 2022, Powell urged employees in a work-meeting to reject the usage of preferred gender pronouns; he then opened a Slack channel to debate why people shall be allowed to choose their gender but neither race nor ethnicity. The next day, Kraken released a "culture document" which outlined the libertarian values that were to be obeyed at work. Among other things, employees were prohibited from labelling others' comments as "toxic, hateful, racist," etc., and particular emphasis was assigned on how "offensiveness" was not forbidden.  Powell and his fellow executives encouraged employees who disagreed with the policy to quit, and offered four months' severance for those who opted to do so.

In November 2022, Kraken laid off about 1,100 employees - approximately 30 percent of its workforce.

See also 

 Binance
 Bitfinex
 Coinbase
 Gemini
 Mt. Gox

References

External links
 

2011 establishments in California
Bitcoin companies
Bitcoin exchanges
Companies based in San Francisco
Digital currency exchanges